Per Bausager (born 6 September 1956) is a Danish racing cyclist. He rode in the 1979 Tour de France.

References

1956 births
Living people
Danish male cyclists
Place of birth missing (living people)